Natalya Coyle (born 11 December 1992) is an Irish athlete who competed in the modern pentathlon at the 2012 Summer Olympics where she finished ninth and 2016 Summer Olympics where she finished sixth.

She has qualified to represent Ireland at the 2020 Summer Olympics.

References

External links
 
 

Living people
Olympic modern pentathletes of Ireland
Irish female modern pentathletes
Modern pentathletes at the 2012 Summer Olympics
Modern pentathletes at the 2016 Summer Olympics
Modern pentathletes at the 2020 Summer Olympics
1992 births
People educated at The King's Hospital
World Modern Pentathlon Championships medalists